Omophron brettinghamae is a species of ground beetle in the family Carabidae. It is distributed in Bangladesh and Vietnam.

It has a length of 3.5 to 4 mm and a width of 2.4 to 2.6 mm. Its colouring is a shiny, very dark metallic green with testaceous (dull red-brick) labrum, palpi, antennae, side margins of prothorax and elytra, apex of venter, and legs.

References

Further reading 
 Andrewes, H. E. (1929). The fauna of British India, including Ceylon and Burmaa. Coleoptera. Carabidae. Vol. 1. – Carabinae. London: Taylor & Francis, xviii: 139–162.
 Gestro, R. (1888). Viaggio di Leonardo fea in Birmania e reģioni vicine. VI. Nuove specie di coleopteri. 71–74.
 Pascoe, F. P. (1860). Notes of new or little-known genera and species of Coleoptera. The Journal of Entomology. 1 : 36–64.

Carabidae
Beetles described in 1860
Taxa named by Francis Polkinghorne Pascoe